FC Stal Kamianske was a professional Ukrainian football club based in Kamianske, Dnipropetrovsk Oblast, Ukraine. After being relegated to the Ukrainian First League after the 2017–18 Ukrainian Premier League season, the club re-registered to Bucha and changed its name to PFC Feniks Bucha in June 2018. The club didn't play any game under the new name and was dissolved on 9 July 2018.

The club was sponsored by the Dnieper Metallurgical Combine (DMK) which is a member of the Industrial Union of Donbas (ISD).

History

The club traces its history to a factory team that was created in 1926 under the name of FC Metalist Kamianske. Later the name was changed to FC Dzerzhynka Kamianske (1934). The team participated in competitions irregularly. It entered Soviet competitions in 1935 as a city's team (Kamianske, 1935–1936) participating in Ukrainian Championship. In 1936, the city of Kamianske was renamed as Dniprodzerzhynsk. In 1936 and in 1938 it entered the Soviet Cup competitions and in 1938 was a runner up of the Ukrainian Championship as Stal Dniprodzerzhynsk yielding only to Dzerzhynets Voroshylovhrad (today FC Zorya Luhansk). There is no record of any competitions in the region during World War II.

In 1945, Dniprodzerzhynsk city players participated in the Ukrainian Spartakiad as members of Dnipropetrovsk Oblast team. In 1949, Metalurh Dniprodzerzhynsk was again a runner-up at the republican competitions, losing a championship playoff to the Kievan Officers' Club (modern FC CSKA Kyiv). Between 1954 and 1975, the Dniprodzerzhynsk metallurgical team did not participate in any national or republican competitions focusing only on regional and city's championships. The club was completely overshadowed by another team from Kamianske (at that time Dniprodzerzhynsk), SC Prometei Dniprodzerzhynsk, that after World War II and until the 1970s was the main city's team.

In 1976, under the name of Metalurh Dniprodzerzhynsk, the team was revived including not only factory players, but also football players of SC Prometei Dniprodzerzhynsk (sports club of the Dnieper Chemical Plant) and Burevisnyk Dniprodzerzhynsk (city's education department sports society). In 1978, the new team won the Ukrainian championship for amateur clubs and was promoted to the Soviet Second League. The club's best achievement was 12th place in the 1982–83 season, and it was soon relegated in 1985.

In 1994, the club became almost defunct. In 1998, the team was reorganized again under the name FC Stal Dniprodzerzhynsk. The team became one of the strongest in Dnipropetrovsk Oblast and in 2001, it was promoted to the Ukrainian amateur championship. In the same year, Stal won the Dnipropetrovsk Oblast Cup and was promoted to the Druha Liha B. In the 2003–04 season, Stal became the champions of the division and were promoted to the Persha Liha.

Stal finished in 20th place (bottom) in the 2007–08 season and were relegated to Ukrainian Second League.

After a six-season absence, the club was promoted to Ukrainian First League in 2014. In 2015, the club was set to merge with FC Metalurh Donetsk. However, on 11 July 2015 Metalurh declared bankruptcy, citing the economic difficulties caused by the War in Donbass. FC Stal Dniprodzerzhynsk did take Metalurh's place in the Ukrainian Premier League.

In May 2016, the city of Dniprodzerzhynsk was renamed back into Kamianske and team name was changed to FC Stal Kamianske.

After being relegated to the Ukrainian First League following the 2017–18 Ukrainian Premier League season, the club re-registered to Bucha (Kyiv Oblast) and changed its name to PFC Feniks Bucha. Before the start of the new season, the club withdrew from 2018–19 Ukrainian First League due to financial difficulties.

Colors and badge

Club's colors are silver, blue and white.

Last squad

Coaches and administration (before dissolving)

Presidents
 2001–2005: Maksym Zavhorodniy
 2005–2007: Oleh Dubina
 2007–2010: Maksym Zavhorodniy
 2010–2011: Illia Buha
 2011–2015: Maksym Zavhorodniy
 2015–2018: Vardan Israelian

Honours
Ukrainian First League
Runners-up (1): 2014–15
Ukrainian Second League
Winners (1): 2003–04
Runners-up (1): 2013–14
Championship of the Ukrainian SSR
Runners-up (2): 1938, 1949 (amateur level competitions until 1960)
Ukrainian KFK championship
Winners (1): 1978
Dnipropetrovsk Oblast Championship
Winners (10): 1938, 1945, 1946, 1947, 1948, 1949, 1950, 1978, 1988, 1992

League and cup history

Soviet Union

{|class="wikitable" style="font-size:90%; text-align: center;"
|-bgcolor="#efefef"
! Season
! Div.
! Pos.
! Pl.
! W
! D
! L
! GS
! GA
! P
!Domestic Cup
!colspan=2|Europe
!Notes
|-
|align=center colspan=14|Stal
|-
|align=center|1936
|align=center|6th "Tretia Hrupa"(Ukrainian Championship)
|align=center bgcolor=gold|W
|align=center colspan=11|Elimination tournament in final Stal beat Dynamo Kryvyi Rih 4:1
|-
|align=center|1937
|align=center|5th "Druha Hrupa"(Ukrainian Championship)
|align=center bgcolor=silver|2
|align=center|5
|align=center|3
|align=center|1
|align=center|1
|align=center|17
|align=center|7
|align=center|12
|align=center|
|align=center|
|align=center|
|align=center|
|-
|align=center|1938
|align=center rowspan=3|4th "Persha Hrupa"(Ukrainian Championship)
|align=center bgcolor=silver|2
|align=center|11
|align=center|7
|align=center|3
|align=center|1
|align=center|40
|align=center|20
|align=center|28
|align=center|
|align=center|
|align=center|
|align=center|
|-
|align=center|1939
|align=center|4
|align=center|9
|align=center|3
|align=center|3
|align=center|3
|align=center|17
|align=center|12
|align=center|18
|align=center|
|align=center|
|align=center|
|align=center|
|-
|align=center|1940
|align=center|4
|align=center|?
|align=center|?
|align=center|?
|align=center|?
|align=center|?
|align=center|?
|align=center|?
|align=center|
|align=center|
|align=center|
|align=center|
|-
|align=center|1941-1944
|align=center colspan=13|Due to World War II, the club was dissolved and did not function.
|-
|align=center colspan=14|Metallurg / Metalurh
|-
|align=center rowspan=2|1948
|align=center rowspan=4|4th "Zone 3"(Ukrainian Championship)
|align=center bgcolor=gold|1
|align=center|10
|align=center|10
|align=center|0
|align=center|0
|align=center|48
|align=center|10
|align=center|20
|align=center rowspan=2|
|align=center rowspan=2|
|align=center rowspan=2|
|align=center|
|-
|align=center bgcolor=tan|3
|align=center|4
|align=center|2
|align=center|0
|align=center|2
|align=center|10
|align=center|8
|align=center|4
|align=center|semifinal group 2
|-
|align=center rowspan=2|1949
|align=center bgcolor=gold|1
|align=center|9
|align=center|7
|align=center|1
|align=center|1
|align=center|34
|align=center|8
|align=center|15
|align=center rowspan=2|
|align=center rowspan=2|
|align=center rowspan=2|
|align=center|
|-
|align=center bgcolor=gold|1
|align=center|4
|align=center|3
|align=center|0
|align=center|1
|align=center|7
|align=center|2
|align=center|6
|align=center|Lost championship playoff to DO Kiev
|-
|align=center|1950
|align=center|4th "Zone 2"(Ukrainian Championship)
|align=center bgcolor=silver|2
|align=center|17
|align=center|13
|align=center|1
|align=center|3
|align=center|40
|align=center|24
|align=center|27
|align=center|
|align=center|
|align=center|
|align=center|
|-
|align=center|1951
|align=center|4th "Zone 4"(Ukrainian Championship)
|align=center|4
|align=center|18
|align=center|11
|align=center|4
|align=center|3
|align=center|40
|align=center|15
|align=center|26
|align=center|
|align=center|
|align=center|
|align=center|
|-
|align=center|1952
|align=center|4th "Zone 3"(Ukrainian Championship)
|align=center|9
|align=center|22
|align=center|5
|align=center|6
|align=center|11
|align=center|19
|align=center|45
|align=center|16
|align=center|
|align=center|
|align=center|
|align=center|
|-
|align=center|1953-1957
|align=center colspan=13|Club's status is unknown
|-
|align=center|1958
|align=center|4th "Zone 8"(Ukrainian Championship)
|align=center|7
|align=center|14
|align=center|3
|align=center|1
|align=center|10
|align=center|11
|align=center|29
|align=center|7
|align=center|
|align=center|
|align=center|
|align=center|
|-
|align=center|1959-1974
|align=center colspan=13|Club's status is unknown
|-
|align=center|1975-1976
|align=center colspan=13|Club participates in regional competitions
|-
|align=center|1977
|align=center rowspan=3|4th(KFK (Ukraine))
|align=center|6
|align=center|22
|align=center|8
|align=center|7
|align=center|7
|align=center|25
|align=center|21
|align=center|23
|align=center|
|align=center|
|align=center|
|align=center|
|-
|align=center rowspan=2|1978
|align=center bgcolor=gold|1
|align=center|18
|align=center|13
|align=center|4
|align=center|1
|align=center|31
|align=center|9
|align=center|30
|align=center rowspan=2|
|align=center rowspan=2|
|align=center rowspan=2|
|align=center|qualified for final group
|-
|align=center bgcolor=gold|1
|align=center|5
|align=center|5
|align=center|0
|align=center|0
|align=center|9
|align=center|3
|align=center|10
|align=center bgcolor=lightgreen|Promoted
|-
|align=center|1979
|align=center rowspan=9|3rd(Vtoraya Liga)
|align=center|23
|align=center|46
|align=center|13
|align=center|8
|align=center|25
|align=center|37
|align=center|71
|align=center|34
|align=center|
|align=center|
|align=center|
|align=center|
|-
|align=center|1980
|align=center|18
|align=center|44
|align=center|11
|align=center|11
|align=center|22
|align=center|47
|align=center|58
|align=center|33
|align=center|
|align=center|
|align=center|
|align=center|
|-
|align=center|1981
|align=center|22
|align=center|44
|align=center|8
|align=center|13
|align=center|23
|align=center|31
|align=center|71
|align=center|29
|align=center|
|align=center|
|align=center|
|align=center|
|-
|align=center|1982
|align=center|12
|align=center|46
|align=center|17
|align=center|9
|align=center|20
|align=center|47
|align=center|47
|align=center|43
|align=center|
|align=center|
|align=center|
|align=center|
|-
|align=center|1983
|align=center|12
|align=center|50
|align=center|17
|align=center|14
|align=center|19
|align=center|35
|align=center|39
|align=center|48
|align=center|
|align=center|
|align=center|
|align=center|
|-
|align=center rowspan=2|1984
|align=center|11
|align=center|24
|align=center|4
|align=center|7
|align=center|13
|align=center|23
|align=center|38
|align=center|15
|align=center rowspan=2|
|align=center rowspan=2|
|align=center rowspan=2|
|align=center|
|-
|align=center|24
|align=center|14
|align=center|5
|align=center|4
|align=center|5
|align=center|17
|align=center|19
|align=center|14
|align=center|
|-
|align=center rowspan=2|1985
|align=center|13
|align=center|26
|align=center|5
|align=center|4
|align=center|17
|align=center|20
|align=center|45
|align=center|14
|align=center rowspan=2|
|align=center rowspan=2|
|align=center rowspan=2|
|align=center|
|-
|align=center|28
|align=center|14
|align=center|4
|align=center|3
|align=center|7
|align=center|14
|align=center|22
|align=center|11
|align=center bgcolor=pink|Relegated
|-
|align=center|1986-1988
|align=center colspan=13|Club participates in regional competitions
|-
|align=center|1989
|align=center|4th(KFK (Ukraine))
|align=center|7
|align=center|24
|align=center|9
|align=center|7
|align=center|8
|align=center|34
|align=center|32
|align=center|25
|align=center|
|align=center|
|align=center|
|align=center|
|-
|align=center|1990-1992
|align=center colspan=13|Club participates in regional competitions
|}

Ukraine

{|class="wikitable" style="font-size:90%; text-align: center;"
|-bgcolor="#efefef"
! Season
! Div.
! Pos.
! Pl.
! W
! D
! L
! GS
! GA
! P
!Domestic Cup
!colspan=2|Europe
!Notes
|-
|align=center colspan=14|Metalurh
|-
|align=center|1992–93
|align=center|4th(Amateurs)
|align=center|10
|align=center|26
|align=center|6
|align=center|11
|align=center|9
|align=center|30
|align=center|30
|align=center|23
|align=center|
|align=center|
|align=center|
|align=center|
|-
|align=center|1993–2001
|align=center colspan=13|Club participates in regional competitions. In 1998 changed its name to Stal.
|-
|align=center|2001
|align=center|4th(Amateurs)
|align=center|2
|align=center|4
|align=center|2
|align=center|1
|align=center|1
|align=center|5
|align=center|4
|align=center|7
|align=center|
|align=center|
|align=center|
|align=center|applied to Second League
|-
|align=center|2001–02
|align=center rowspan=3|3rd "C"(Druha Liha)
|align=center|12
|align=center|34
|align=center|11
|align=center|7
|align=center|16
|align=center|29
|align=center|47
|align=center|40
|align=center|Did not enter
|align=center|
|align=center|
|align=center|
|-
|align=center|2002–03
|align=center|5
|align=center|28
|align=center|16
|align=center|4
|align=center|8
|align=center|35
|align=center|22
|align=center|52
|align=center|1/32 finals
|align=center|
|align=center|
|align=center|
|-
|align=center|2003–04
|align=center bgcolor=gold|1
|align=center|30
|align=center|23
|align=center|6
|align=center|1
|align=center|53
|align=center|16
|align=center|75
|align=center|1/32 finals
|align=center|
|align=center|
|align=center bgcolor=lightgreen|Promoted
|-
|align=center|2004–05
|align=center rowspan=4|2nd(Persha Liha)
|align=center|9
|align=center|34
|align=center|14
|align=center|7
|align=center|13
|align=center|42
|align=center|47
|align=center|49
|align=center|1/16 finals
|align=center|
|align=center|
|align=center|
|-
|align=center|2005–06
|align=center|8
|align=center|34
|align=center|13
|align=center|9
|align=center|12
|align=center|34
|align=center|29
|align=center|48
|align=center|1/8 finals
|align=center|
|align=center|
|align=center|
|-
|align=center|2006–07
|align=center|9
|align=center|36
|align=center|15
|align=center|8
|align=center|13
|align=center|42
|align=center|37
|align=center|53
|align=center|1/4 finals
|align=center|
|align=center|
|align=center|
|-
|align=center|2007–08
|align=center|20
|align=center|38
|align=center|3
|align=center|11
|align=center|24
|align=center|23
|align=center|58
|align=center|20
|align=center|1/32 finals
|align=center|
|align=center|
|align=center bgcolor=pink|Relegated
|-
|align=center|2008–09
|align=center rowspan=7|3rd "B"(Druha Liha)
|align=center bgcolor=tan|3
|align=center|34
|align=center|21
|align=center|7
|align=center|6
|align=center|62
|align=center|29
|align=center|70
|align=center|1/32 finals
|align=center|
|align=center|
|align=center|
|-
|align=center|2009–10
|align=center|4
|align=center|26
|align=center|15
|align=center|6
|align=center|5
|align=center|38
|align=center|23
|align=center|51
|align=center|1/16 finals
|align=center|
|align=center|
|align=center|
|-
|align=center|2010–11
|align=center|4
|align=center|22
|align=center|10
|align=center|7
|align=center|5
|align=center|32
|align=center|18
|align=center|37
|align=center|1/16 finals
|align=center|
|align=center|
|align=center|
|-
|align=center|2011–12
|align=center|6
|align=center|26
|align=center|15
|align=center|3
|align=center|8
|align=center|34
|align=center|19
|align=center|48
|align=center|1/8 finals
|align=center|
|align=center|
|align=center|
|-
|align=center rowspan="2"|2012–13
|align=center|8
|align=center|24 		 	
|align=center|10 	
|align=center|3 	
|align=center|11 		
|align=center|47 		 	
|align=center|30 	 	
|align=center|33
|align=center rowspan=2|1/16 finals
|align=center rowspan=2|
|align=center rowspan=2|
|align=center|qualified for Group 4
|-
|align=center|2
|align=center|8	
|align=center|5 		
|align=center|1 	
|align=center|2 			
|align=center|16	
|align=center|10 	 	
|align=center|16
|align=center|Relegation group 4
|-
|align=center|2013–14
|align=center bgcolor=silver|2
|align=center|36
|align=center|23
|align=center|8
|align=center|5
|align=center|81
|align=center|32
|align=center|77
|align=center|1/16 finals
|align=center|
|align=center|
|align=center bgcolor=lightgreen|Promoted
|-
|align=center|2014–15
|align=center|2nd(Persha Liha)
|align=center bgcolor=silver|2
|align=center|30
|align=center|17
|align=center|9
|align=center|4
|align=center|45
|align=center|21
|align=center|60
|align=center|1/8 finals
|align=center|
|align=center|
|align=center bgcolor=lightgreen|Promoted
|-
|align=center|2015–16
|align=center rowspan=3|1st(Premier Liha)
|align=center|8
|align=center|26 	
|align=center|7 	
|align=center|8 	
|align=center|11 	
|align=center|22 	
|align=center|31 
|align=center|29
|align=center| 1/4 finals 
|align=center|
|align=center|
|align=center|
|-
|align=center|2016–17
|align=center|8
|align=center|32 	
|align=center|11 	
|align=center|8 	
|align=center|13 	
|align=center|27 	
|align=center|31 	
|align=center|41
|align=center| 1/8 finals
|align=center|
|align=center|
|align=center|
|-
|align=center|2017–18
|align=center|12
|align=center|32
|align=center|6
|align=center|8	
|align=center|18	
|align=center|23
|align=center|44
|align=center|26
|align=center| 1/8 finals
|align=center|
|align=center|
|align=center bgcolor=pink|Relegated and withdrew
|-
|align=center colspan=14|Feniks
|}

See also
 SC Prometei Dniprodzerzhynsk
 FC Prometei Dniprodzerzhynsk

References and notes

External links
 Official website

 
Association football clubs established in 1926
Association football clubs disestablished in 2018
Defunct football clubs in Ukraine
Football clubs in the Ukrainian Soviet Socialist Republic
Football clubs in Kamianske
Industrial Union of Donbas
1926 establishments in Ukraine
2018 disestablishments in Ukraine
Metallurgy association football clubs in Ukraine
Sports team relocations